Chipulukusu is an informal settlement and a suburb of Ndola, Zambia (east of the town centre). It is located adjacent to the Zambian railway line and behind an urban area called Northrise.

References

Ndola